Muzammil Nizam (born 29 October 1990) is a Pakistani cricketer. He made his first-class debut for Rawalpindi in the 2010–11 Quaid-e-Azam Trophy on 4 November 2010.

References

External links
 

1990 births
Living people
Pakistani cricketers
Place of birth missing (living people)
Rawalpindi cricketers
Sui Southern Gas Company cricketers